Vegeta is a condiment which is a mixture primarily of salt with flavour enhancers, spices and various vegetables developed in 1959 by a Bosnian Croat scientist Zlata Bartl, and has become a product sold worldwide.

Vegeta is produced by Podravka, a company from Koprivnica, Croatia, as well as a subsidiary of Podravka in Poland and two Vegeta licensees from Austria and Hungary. There have been around 50 instances of other companies attempting to reproduce the product.

Vegeta was conceived in 1958 in Podravka's laboratories and professor Paul Ivanić was head of the team that developed it. The product was first sold in Yugoslavia in 1959 as "Vegeta 40". In 1967 Vegeta was first exported to Hungary and the USSR and is now sold in around 40 countries worldwide.

There is also a "no MSG added" version for those avoiding monosodium glutamate.

Ingredients

The ingredients of Vegeta include (according to the 2008 product packaging):
 salt max. 56%
 dehydrated vegetables 15.5% (carrot, parsnip, onions, celery, parsley leaves)
 flavour enhancers (MSG max. 15%, disodium inosinate)
 sugar
 spices
 cornstarch
 riboflavin (for yellow coloring)

References

External links
 Podravka's page on Vegeta

Products introduced in 1959
Brand name condiments
Croatian cuisine
Croatian brands
Croatian inventions
Herb and spice mixtures
Economy of Koprivnica